Wilhelm Xylander (born Wilhelm Holtzman, graecized to Xylander; 26 December 153210 February 1576) was a German classical scholar and humanist. He served as rector of Heidelberg University in 1564.

Biography
Born at Augsburg, he studied at Tübingen, and in 1558, when very short of money (caused, according to some, by his intemperate habits), he was appointed to succeed Jakob Micyllus in the professorship of Greek at the University of Heidelberg; he exchanged it for a chair of logic (publicus organi Aristotelici interpres) in 1562.

In Heidelberg church and university politics, Xylander was a close partisan of Thomas Erastus.

Xylander was the author of a number of important works, including Latin translations of Dio Cassius (1558), Plutarch (1560–1570) and Strabo (1571). He also edited (1568) the geographical lexicon of Stephanus of Byzantium; the travels of Pausanias (completed after his death by Friedrich Sylburg, 1583); the Meditations of Marcus Aurelius (1558), the editio princeps based on a Heidelberg manuscript now lost; a second edition in 1568 with the addition of Antoninus Liberalis, Phlegon of Tralles, an unknown Apollonius, and Antigonus of Carystus—all paradoxographers; and the chronicle of George Cedrenus (1566). He translated the first six books of Euclid into German with notes, the Arithmetica of Diophantus, and the De quattuor mathematicis scientiis of Michael Psellus into Latin.

He died on 10 February 1576 in Heidelberg.

Works
Marcus Aurelius, De seipso, seu vita sua, libri 12 ed. and trans. by Xylander. Zurich: Andreas Gessner, 1558.

References

External links
 
 Works of Wilhelm Xylander available at the Munich Digitisation Centre (MDZ)

1532 births
1576 deaths
German classical scholars
University of Tübingen alumni
Academic staff of Heidelberg University
Academic staff of the Humboldt University of Berlin
Greek–Latin translators